Saint Eusebius of Mâcon was a 6th-century bishop of Mâcon in France.

He is known to have attended  the Second Council of Mâcon in 581 and Third Council of Mâcon in 581 and 585.

He is considered a saint of the Roman Catholic Church.

References

6th-century Frankish bishops
Year of birth unknown
Bishops of Mâcon
6th-century Christian saints
Gallo-Roman saints